Saitama University (埼玉大学, Saitama Daigaku) is a Japanese national university located in a suburban area of Sakura-ku, Saitama City, capital of Saitama Prefecture in Tokyo Metropolitan Area.

Founded in 1873, it became a national university is 1949, and currently has five faculties (schools) for undergraduate education: Liberal Arts, Education, Economics, Science, and Engineering; and four graduate schools: Cultural Science, Education, Economic Science, and Science and Engineering. All of these schools offer programs leading to doctorates as well as master's degrees. The total enrollment in the university is more than 8,500 with more than 500 overseas students pursuing undergraduate and postgraduate studies. Its abbreviated form is Saidai (埼大).

History 

The predecessor of the university, Saitama Normal School, was founded in 1873. It was chartered as a national university in 1949 by the merger of  established 1929, and  established 1922.

Campuses

Ōkubo campus 
Ōkubo campus is the main campus in Saitama university and can be accessed by bus or walking from Minami-Yono Station, Kita-Urawa Station, or Shiki Station.

Satellite campuses 
Saitama university has two satellite campuses:
 Omiya Sonic City College (accessed from Ōmiya Station)
 Tokyo Station College (accessed from Tōkyō Station)

International Graduate Program

To provide aspiring overseas students an opportunity to pursue higher education in Japan, International Graduate Program on Civil and Environmental Engineering was launched by the Graduate School of Science and Engineering in 1992. It offers opportunities to highly qualified students from overseas to pursue graduate studies and do research in various disciplines of environmental science and civil engineering. The fields of study include Infrastructure Management, Transportation Planning, Environmental Engineering, Ecological Engineering, Coastal, and Ocean Engineering, Hydraulics and Water Resources Engineering, Geotechnical and Geological Engineering, Concrete and Material Engineering, Structural and Wind Engineering, Earthquake Engineering.

The graduate program includes courses specially designed for international students, in which class instruction and research supervision are given in English and/or Japanese. Master thesis and doctoral dissertation are accepted in English. Japanese language courses are also offered for foreign students and their spouses. So far, 215 students from different countries have graduated from this program and are now engaged in academic and professional activities in different parts of the world.

Notable alumni
Takaaki Kajita - 2015 Nobel Prize in Physics winner
Lê Minh Hưng - Governor of the State Bank of Vietnam

Gallery

References

External links

 Saitama University
 Saitama University
 International Graduate Program on Civil and Environmental Engineering

 
Japanese national universities
Buildings and structures in Saitama (city)
Educational institutions established in 1873
Educational institutions established in 1949
Universities and colleges in Saitama Prefecture
1873 establishments in Japan
1949 establishments in Japan